Krasny Khleborob is a rural locality (a khutor) in Ayryumovskoye Rural Settlement of Giaginsky District, Adygea, Russia. The population was 43 as of 2018. There are 2 streets.

Geography 
Krasny Khleborob is located 17 km east of Giaginskaya (the district's administrative centre) by road. Progress is the nearest rural locality.

References 

Rural localities in Giaginsky District